Umvoti may refer to:

 SS Clan Alpine (1942)
 Umvoti, KwaZulu-Natal, a town in KwaZulu-Natal, South Africa
 Umvoti River, a river in KwaZulu-Natal, South Africa